The U.S. District Court for the Northern District of Indiana (in case citations, N.D. Ind.) was created in 1928 by an act of Congress that split Indiana into two separate districts, northern and southern.  As part of the act, the Northern District was divided into three divisions, South Bend, Fort Wayne, and Hammond (which has a sub-office in Lafayette). Appeals from this court are taken to the United States Court of Appeals for the Seventh Circuit (except for patent claims and claims against the U.S. government under the Tucker Act, which are appealed to the Federal Circuit).  The court has eight judges and four magistrate judges. As of October 2021, the United States Attorney is Clifford D. Johnson.

History 

Of all district courts to be subdivided, Indiana existed for the longest time as a single court, 111 years.

Divisions of the Northern District 

Fort Wayne: Adams County, Allen County, Blackford County, DeKalb County, Grant County, Huntington County, Jay County, LaGrange County, Noble County, Steuben County, Wells County, and Whitley County.  
Hammond: Lake County and Porter County.  
Lafayette: Benton County, Carroll County, Jasper County, Newton County, Tippecanoe County, Warren County and White County.  
South Bend: Cass County, Elkhart County, Fulton County, Kosciusko County, LaPorte County, Marshall County, Miami County, Pulaski County, St. Joseph County, Starke County and Wabash County.

Current judges 
:

Vacancies and pending nominations

Former judges

Chief judges

Succession of seats

List of U.S. Attorneys since 1928 
 Oliver Mullins Loomis 1928–1933
 James R. Fleming 1933–1941
 Alexander M. Campbell 1941–1949
 Gilmore Haynie 1949–1953
 Joseph H. Lesh 1953–1954
 Phil M. McNagny Jr. 1954–1958
 Kenneth C. Raub 1959–1962
 Philip C. Potts 1962
 Alfred Moellering 1962–1970
 William C. Lee 1970–1973
 John R. Wilks 1973–1977
 David T. Ready 1977–1981
 R. Lawrence Steel Jr. 1981–1985
 James G. Richmond 1985–1991
 John F. Hoehner 1991–1993
 Jon DeGuilio 1993–1999
 Joseph S. Van Bokkelen 2001–2007
 David A. Capp 2007–2017
 Thomas Kirsch 2017–2020
 Clifford D. Johnson 2021–present

See also 
 Courts of Indiana
 List of current United States district judges
 List of United States federal courthouses in Indiana

References

External links 
 United States District Court, Northern District of Indiana

Indiana, Northern District
Indiana law
South Bend, Indiana
Fort Wayne, Indiana
Hammond, Indiana
Courthouses in Indiana
1928 establishments in Indiana
Courts and tribunals established in 1928